Fritzie Zivic (May 8, 1913 – May 16, 1984), born as Ferdinand Henry John Zivcich, was an American boxer who held the world welterweight championship from October 4, 1940, until July 29, 1941. His managers included Luke Carney, and later, after 1942, Louis Stokan.

Early life
Zivic was born the youngest son of immigrant parents; his father was Croatian, his mother, Mary Kepele was Slovenian. As a young man, he followed the example of his four elder brothers, who boxed, and became known as the "Fighting Zivics". His brothers Pete and Jack, the first and second born, went to the 1920 Antwerp Olympics. Referring to his youth in the rough, tribal, and crowded Ninth Ward of Lawrenceville, Zivic later said, "You either had to fight or stay in the house. We went out."

Professional career
Against one of his most skilled early opponents, Zivic defeated Charley Burley, fellow Pittsburgh boxer, for the only time on March 21, 1938, in their hometown. Characteristic of Zivic's later boxing, he dominated the in-fighting. Burley started well, but in the later rounds, the more experienced Zivic scored with rights hooks to the midsection and pulled Burley in during clinches to reduce Burley's long range game. In two other meetings, in June 1938, and July 1939, Zivic lost in ten round unanimous decisions. The well managed Burley would amass an impressive record of eighty-three with only twelve losses in his career.

Zivic lost to Billy Conn, 1939 world light heavyweight champion, on December 28, 1936 before 5,163 in a ten-round split decision at Duquesne Garden in Pittsburgh. In a relatively close bout, the referee scored for Zivic with 5 rounds to 4 for Conn, but both judges scored for Conn. About a minute into the third, Conn struck Zivic with a right to the chest that slowed him somewhat for the rest of the fight, though his effort was still considerable. In the first five rounds, Conn took considerable punishment, and the scoring favored Zivic, if not unanimously. Conn showed more energy, and footwork, and in the later rounds his long, punishing left scored consistent points against Zivic in long range fighting. Conn, at 6' 2", enjoyed around two inches of reach advantage over Zivic, which he used more frequently in later rounds. The bout included no knockdowns but in the fourth and fifth rounds, Zivic caught Conn on the ropes and belted him about head and body til it appeared a knockout was a possible outcome. From the sixth to the tenth, Conn fought more from a distance and in the eighth and ninth boxed brilliantly, using feints and footwork and his long, solid left. Zivic went to the body with hooks and crosses but failed to fatigue Conn who fought on and gained points. In an action packed tenth, Zivic first went inside and fought toe to toe with Conn, eventually getting him against the ropes, but Conn went back to boxing at long range and removed some of the loss in points he had suffered during the infighting, keeping the round close. 

Zivic defeated Johnny Jadick, former junior welterweight champion, on February 11, 1937 in a six-round knockout at Duquesne Garden in Pittsburgh. In a decisive victory, Zivic had Jadick down for a nine count in the first round, but let up some in the next three. He put Jadick down again at the end of the second for a count of five, before the bell sounded. Jadick took the count of ten from a blow by Zivic, 1:16 into the sixth round.  Zivic had previously lost to Jadick in a ten-round points decision in Washington in February 1935.

On January 20, 1939, Zivic defeated Jackie Burke, former holder of the Utah's Intermountain Welterweight Title, and Pacific Southwest Welterweight Title, in a ten-round mixed decision at the St. Louis Coliseum. Uppercuts to the head of Burke during the frequent infighting determined the outcome of the fight, and though both boxers got in telling blows, there were no knockdowns. In a close bout, the referee scored 51 to 49 for Zivic, and though one judge scored a draw, the remaining judge scored 53-47 in Zivic's favor. 

He notably defeated Sammy Angott, reigning NBA lightweight champion, in a non-title bout on August 29, 1940, in a ten-round unanimous decision at Forbes Field in Pittsburgh. The bout was part of an elimination match to determine who would face Henry Armstrong for his world welterweight title. Zivic took the last six of the ten rounds. According to Zivic later, his purse of $3,200 for the win, was the largest he had yet received.

Taking the world welterweight title against Henry Armstrong, October, 1940
In the most significant win of his career, Zivic upset Henry "Hammering Hank" Armstrong on October 4, 1940 in a fifteen-round decision before 12,081 at Madison Square Garden, taking the world welterweight title despite being a 4-1 underdog. He started by scoring with short right uppercuts in the early rounds. By the ninth, Armstrong's left eye was a slit, and his right nearly as swollen, allowing Zivic to easily dance away when Armstrong attempted to mount a desperate clumsy attempt at a knockout in the final round. Zivic mounted a slow effective attack, but held no wide margin, as the referee and both judges awarded him eight of the fifteen rounds in the close bout. The Associated Press gave Zivic nine rounds with Armstrong six. Zivic did not take a points lead until the sixth and seventh when he banged away with short, accurate, right uppercuts.

According to Zivic's account, the first bout with Armstrong included questionable tactics and fouls. Zivic claimed Armstrong started out fighting that way, noting, "Henry's givin' me the elbows and the shoulders and the top of the head, and I can give that stuff back pretty good, but I don't dare to or maybe they'll throw me out of the ring." By the seventh round, Zivic had had enough, and began responding in kind. At least one source noted that the referee, aware of the rough fighting that could be called as fouls gave up, and allowed the combatants to fight using whatever methods they were comfortable with, barring obvious fouls.

Winning title rematch with Henry Armstrong, January, 1941
In his most memorable victory, he won the world welterweight title rematch with Hank Armstrong in a twelfth-round technical knockout, at Madison Square Garden, on January 17, 1941. It was the first knockout ever registered against Armstrong in his stellar career as a multiple weight class champion. The impressive crowd of 23,190 fans, considered the largest indoor crowd ever to see a professional boxing match, witnessed Armstrong, the former welterweight champion, nearly helpless when the referee called the match 52 seconds into the twelfth round. As early as the first round, Zivic jabbed easily at Armstrong's open face, and then looped in uppercuts. The United Press gave Armstrong only the third and the eleventh. In the third, Armstrong was able to stagger Zivic briefly with hard hooks to the head. As the bout wore on, Armstrong tired badly, and was continuously the victim of Zivic's short uppercuts, which snapped back his head. He was down in the sixth for a no-count from a right uppercut by Zivic. In the eighth, the referee stopped to examine the cuts on Armstrong caused by the battering he took in the round.

Armstrong made a valiant effort in the eleventh with a barrage of hooks to the head and body of Zivic, allowing him to take the round. Armstrong caught Zivic in a corner and battered him with short jarring blows and then landed a right to the face, but it was a last valiant effort. The ring doctor examined Armstrong after the round ended, and allowed him to continue, but the referee stopped the fight in the twelfth when Zivic lashed his left repeatedly at the face of Armstrong.

Losing the world welterweight title against Fred "Red" Cochran, July, 1941
Zivic lost his world welterweight title in a fifteen-round decision against Red Cochran before 10,000 fans on July 29, 1941 at Rupert Stadium in Newark, NJ. Cochrane effectively threw left hooks to the belly against the straight rights of Zivic. He butted Zivic with his head, when Zivic attempted to illegally put an arm around his neck to hammer him with his left. In a back-alley brawl type of fighting, Cochrane threw a left hook into Zivic's groin after he claimed to have been continuously thumbed in the eye by Zivic, though the resulting penalty call gave the round to Zivic. Zivic's late comeback attempt in the final five rounds was not overlooked by the press, as many considered him obtaining more points in each of the last five rounds. The referee gave Cochran seven rounds, four to Zivic, and four even, with the single judge scoring the same. The United Press, however gave six rounds to each boxer, with three as draws. Most believed Cochrane's ability to force the fighting throughout and land more telling blows made him deserve the close decision.

Immediately after his loss of the title, on September 15, 1941, Zivic achieved a fifth-round knockout of Milt Aaron in the feature match at Pittsburgh's Forbes Field, before an appreciative hometown audience of 24,972 fans. As Aron was trying to exit a corner of the ring, Zivic knocked him out with a bolo punch, a crossing right hand smash to the jaw, 1:58 into the fifth. Typical of Zivic's rough style of boxing, he excelled in the infighting in the first four rounds. Zivic had previously lost to Aron in an eight-round knockout on December 27, 1939. In the exciting match, Aron was down three times in round two, but Aron put Zivic down once in the seventh. After taking a beating in the eighth, Zivic uncorked a terrific right that caught Zivic squarely on his jaw putting him down, then sealed the deal after he got up with a left and right on the chin for the count.

Boxing highlights after loss of the title, Sugar Ray Robinson, Beau Jack, Jake Lamotta, Beau Montgomery

He lost to the great Sugar Ray Robinson, a future Hall of Famer, on January 16, 1942 in a tenth-round technical knockout before 15,745 fans at Madison Square Garden. Robinson used blinding speed in the opening rounds to overwhelm Zivic. He took the sixth with sharp lefts, but Zivic clearly won the seventh with hooks to the midsection. Robinson dropped Zivic with a long right overhand smash late in the ninth, and floored him with a two fisted attack in the tenth. Zivic was trying to get to his feet at the count of six, but the referee stopped the bout 31 seconds into the round before he could fully rise. In what was scored as a close bout, the Associated Press gave Robinson five of the nine, while Zivic took three and one was even. It was only the second time Zivic had been stopped before the end of a bout. Impressively, for Robinson, it was his twenty-seventh straight win, with twenty-one via knockout.  

Zivic defeated Italian boxer "Izzy" Anthony Jannazzo on March 9, 1942, leaving Janazzo unable to return to the ring for the fifth round at Duquesne Gardens in Pittsburgh. Zivic swarmed all over Jannazzo in the first, closing Jannazzo's eye in the second, and firing at it in the third and fourth, till Januzzo, unable to see, failed to answer the fifth round bell. A skilled middleweight, Jannazzo had contended for the world welterweight title against Barney Ross in November 1936 at Madison Square Garden.  

On April 13, 1942, Zivic defeated Jewish Canadian boxer Maxie Berger, former holder of the Montreal Athletic Commission's Junior World Welterweight Title, in a ten-round points decision at Duquesne Gardens in Pittsburgh. A crowd of 5,000 watched Zivic knock Berger to the canvas a total of seven times, over the fourth, sixth, eighth, and tenth. Berger rallied in the tenth to keep he round even in scoring. Berger's toughest round was the sixth when he was down for counts of nine, eight, and two. In the fourth, Berger was hit by a low right from Zivic, and changed to more defensive tactics afterward, which reduced the slight points advantage he may have held in the first three rounds. With the exception of the seventh, the fifth through the eighth were all Zivic's who gained a strong lead in points. 

He defeated Lew Jenkins, a 1940 world lightweight champion, on May 25, 1942, before 12,134 fans, in a decisive ten-round technical knockout in Pittsburgh. With sharp, rapid two fisted punching, Zivic carved Jenkins' face severely, connecting often. His ripping rights and left hooks opened two old cuts on Jenkins' face early in the bout.  After the ninth, a ring doctor refused to allow a badly battered and bleeding Jenkins to return to the ring for the tenth round. Though not officially considered knockdowns, five times in the second, sixth, and eighth rounds, Jenkins spun around and fell to the canvas. He had drawn with Jenkins on December 20, 1940 in a ten-round points decision at the fabled Madison Square Garden.

Losses to lightweight champion Beau Jack, February, March 1943 
Zivic lost to reigning world lightweight champion and future Hall of Fame boxer, Beau Jack in a non-title bout on March 5, 1943 in a unanimous but close twelve-round decision in Madison Square Garden before a crowd of 8,813. All three of the judges gave Zivic five rounds in the bout. In the bitterly contested brawl, both boxers lost a round for low blows. Zivic took the sixth, uncharacteristically fighting at long range, but the seventh was closer with a slight edge for Jack. Oddly, Zivic took a beating in the eighth but won the round on a foul, while Jack took punishment in the ninth, but also won the bout on a foul. Zivic took the tenth, but the eleventh and twelfth appeared even because of Jack's strong efforts and last attempts at a knockout. Zivic enjoyed a ten-pound weight advantage as well as an advantage in reach of around two inches. Zivic had lost to Jack two months earlier on February 5, 1943, and though Beau was a 3-1 favorite, Zivic had nearly come out ahead of the twelve-round decision before an impressive 21,240 at Madision Square Garden.  A low blow in the eighth round made by Zivic cost him the round in the close bout and caused some controversy. The Associated Press gave five rounds to Jack, four to Zivic, and one even. If not for the foul call against Zivic in the eighth, the AP scoring would have been a draw, though the official ring judges considered Jack the victor by a slightly larger margin.

Victory over Jake LaMotta, July, 1943
He defeated the great Jake LaMotta only once in a fifteen-round split decision in Pittsburgh on July 12, 1943 before a crowd of 15,562. LaMotta at twenty, ten years younger than Zivic, rushed and landed clean blows throughout the bout, but Zivic scored with his signature left jab, and retained his strength till the tenth round, when he opened up on LaMotta with frequent blows. In the fifth and sixth, Zivic scored well with his left, but was behind in the early rounds, particularly taking a beating in the first. The boxers appeared to fight cautiously realizing the power of their opponent. Zivic had dropped a bout in the previous month to LaMotta in a ten-round split decision, another close bout in Pittsburgh. Zivic lost in two other meetings, one in January 1944, despite LaMotta losing two rounds from low blows, and one in November 1943 in a relatively close bout in Madison Square Garden.

Zivic lost to reigning NYSAC world lightweight champion Bob Montgomery on August 23, 1943 in a non-title, ten round unanimous decision at Shibe Park in Philadelphia. In a decisive loss, the referee and one judge scored eight rounds for Montgomery, two for Zivic, though the second judge gave only five rounds to Montgomery with three to Zivic, and two even.  

Zivic first lost to Freddy Archer on March 29, 1944 in a ten-round points decision at Elizabeth, Pennsylvania. Though Zivic was favored at 7-5, Archer mounted a relentless attack which at its best featured stinging left hooks to the head and body. Archer took a points lead early with a smashing away with both hands, causing Zivic to retreat or tie him up in clinches. With a clear margin of victory, the referee gave Archer six rounds, with only the fourth and seventh to Zivic, and the sixth and ninth even. Though going into the seventh, Zivic scored with one of his strongest left and rights to the head, Archer shook them off and finished the round without allowing Zivic to close for a knockout. 

Before a respectable crowd of 10,000, in a ten-round split decision on June 26, 1944, Zivic lost to 1946 world welterweight contender black boxer Tommy Bell, who had to come from behind to take Zivic in the closing rounds. Zivic was serving as a Private in the Army Air Corps, and had been away from the ring for three months. In the opening rounds, Bell was schooled by Zivic, who made him constantly miss and dominated at close quarters. The referee and one judge gave only two rounds to Zivic, but the Associated Press saw differently, scoring four for Bell with only three for Zivic with three even. Bell, a quality opponent who would challenge Robinson for the world welterweight title in 1946, made his thirty-eighth consecutive win with the victory. While still in the Army, Zivic defeated Billy Arnold on January 5, 1945 in a convincing eight round mixed decision at Madison Square Garden before an impressive house of 16,923. Zivic, now a Corporal, took a points lead with upper-cuts, short hooks, and basic brawling, and dominated the infighting. Zivic staggered Arnold in the third, fifth and eighth.  

He never challenged for a world title after 1941, but from 1941 to 1946, he fought the great boxers Sugar Ray Robinson, Beau Jack, Tommy Bell, Billy Arnold, Jake LaMotta, and Freddie Archer. In all, he met seven future Hall of Famers and nine world champions. His career record was 158-64-9, with 80 knockouts.

Life after boxing
Although his fighting tactics included thumbing his opponents in the eye, using his knees or elbows as weapons after a punch, or punching in banned areas, he was also known for apologizing for his tactics to his opponent. "He had a body like a wire, a mind like a chess player, a quick wit and a splendid smile."

Zivic served in the Army Air Corp during the end of WWII, being stationed for a time at San Antonio's Normoyle Field, where he continued his boxing schedule in Texas and the Southwest.  

He attempted a wide range of professions starting with promoting, and managing boxers. Between the mid-1950s and mid-1960s, he worked in a steel mill, sold wine, whiskey and beer, bartended, worked as a disc jockey, and labored on a county work crew. He eventually settled into his profession as a steel fabricator or boilermaker with a union card, and got steady work in construction. A popular boxer during his career, he could draw audiences as an after dinner speaker on occasion.

He died after a long battle with Alzheimer's disease in 1984 after a three-year stay at Veteran's Hospital in Aspinwall, Pennsylvania and was buried in Pittsburgh's St. Nicholas Cemetery. A stroke had left him speechless around 1982 when he was first hospitalized. He was inducted into the International Boxing Hall of Fame in 1993. He was survived by his wife Helen, two sons, a daughter, and four grandchildren.

Quotes

"You're boxing, you're not playing the piano."

Professional boxing record
All information in this section is derived from BoxRec, unless otherwise stated.

Official record

All newspaper decisions are officially regarded as “no decision” bouts and are not counted in the win/loss/draw column.

Unofficial record

Record with the inclusion of newspaper decisions in the win/loss/draw column.

Footnotes

See also
List of welterweight boxing champions

Bibliography
Timpav, CHAMP - Fritzie Zivic - The life and time of the Croat Comet.

External links

  Annual Ratings: Welterweight 1940s
  NBA Quarterly Ratings: 1940
  NBA Quarterly Ratings: 1941
  NYSAC Title Histories
  Cyberboxingzone

American people of Croatian descent
American people of Slovenian descent
Deaths from Alzheimer's disease
Neurological disease deaths in Pennsylvania
Boxers from Pittsburgh
Welterweight boxers
World boxing champions
1913 births
1984 deaths
International Boxing Hall of Fame inductees
American male boxers